, provisional designation , is a 1:6 resonant trans-Neptunian object located in the outermost region of the Solar System that takes almost a thousand years to complete an orbit around the Sun. It was discovered on 24 September 2008 by American astronomers Megan Schwamb, Michael Brown and David Rabinowitz at the Palomar Observatory in California, with no known earlier precovery images.

Numbering and naming 

This minor planet was numbered by the Minor Planet Center on 18 May 2019. As of 2019, it has not been named.

Orbit and classification 

 is located at the 1:6 Neptune resonance of 99 AU meaning that it completes roughly 1 orbit for every 6 orbits Neptune makes. It orbits the Sun at a distance of 42.3–157.5 AU once every 998 years and 4 months (semi-major axis of 99.89 AU). Its orbit has an eccentricity of 0.58 and an inclination of 21° with respect to the ecliptic. Currently located at 60.9 AU from the Sun, the object came to perihelion in 1954.

Physical characteristics 

Astronomer Mike Brown estimates a slightly smaller 549 km from the same albedo and a fainter 4.6 magnitude. The Asteroid Dynamic Site records a brighter 4.3 magnitude, which calculates to 612 km using the same albedo (and same formula as Johnston's); using the average of these magnitudes and a standard assumed minor planet albedo range of 0.25 ~ 0.05, possible sizes of 345 to 773 km are produced.

See also 
 List of Solar System objects most distant from the Sun
 List of trans-Neptunian objects

Notes

References

External links 
 Orbit Fit and Astrometric record for 528381, Marc W. Buie, SwRI
 List Of Centaurs and Scattered-Disk Objects, Minor Planet Center
 
 

528381
528381
Discoveries by Megan E. Schwamb
Discoveries by Michael E. Brown
Discoveries by David L. Rabinowitz
528381
20080924